William Perry Holaday (December 14, 1882 – January 29, 1946) was a U.S. Representative from the state of Illinois.

Biography
Holaday was born near Ridge Farm, Illinois. He attended the common schools and Vermilion Academy in nearby Vermilion Grove. He entered Penn College (now William Penn University) in Oskaloosa, Iowa, then transferred to the University of Missouri. Holaday received his law degree from the University of Illinois in 1905, and was admitted to the bar the same year. His initial legal practice was in Danville, Illinois.

Holaday served as assistant prosecuting attorney of Vermilion County from 1905 until 1907. He served as member of the State house of representatives from 1909 until 1923.

Holaday was elected as a Republican to the Sixty-eighth and to the four succeeding Congresses (March 4, 1923 – March 3, 1933). He was an unsuccessful candidate for reelection in 1932 to the Seventy-third Congress, after which he resumed the practice of Law in Danville.

Holaday died in Georgetown, Illinois on January 29, 1946. He was interred in Georgetown Cemetery.

References

External links
 

1882 births
1946 deaths
William Penn University alumni
University of Missouri alumni
University of Illinois College of Law alumni
Republican Party members of the Illinois House of Representatives
Republican Party members of the United States House of Representatives from Illinois
People from Georgetown, Illinois
20th-century American politicians
People from Vermilion County, Illinois
People from Danville, Illinois